Adolfo Hohenstein (18 March 1854 – 12 April 1928) was a German painter, advertiser, illustrator, set designer and costume designer. Hohenstein is considered the father of Italian poster art  and an exponent of the Stile Liberty, the Italian Art Nouveau. Together with Leonetto Cappiello, Giovanni Mario Mataloni, Leopoldo Metlicovitz and Marcello Dudovich, he is considered one of the most important Italian poster designers .

Early years

Adolfo Hohenstein was born in Saint Petersburg, the capital of Russian Empire, to German parents, Julius and Laura Irack. His father was a forest engineer, whose career prompted him to travel extensively. Adolfo moved to Vienna where he grew up and completed his studies. His travels took him to India, where he decorated the houses of the local nobility.

The Italian experience
In 1879, he settled down in Milan, Italy. He became a set and costume designer for La Scala and other theatres. There he met the musical publisher Giulio Ricordi, and in 1889 began to work for the Ricordi Graphical Workshops, where he shortly became the artistic director in charge of the graphical part. He created the posters for La Bohème and Tosca, as well as publicity for Campari, Buitoni and Corriere della Sera, numerous postcards, covers for scores and booklets. His work continued to cover the theatrical dimension: scenarios and wardrobes for several works, among them Giuseppe Verdi's Falstaff (1893) and a major part of the works of Giacomo Puccini, from the sketches of Le Villi (1884) to posters of Madama Butterfly (1904). At Ricordi's he had as colleague Giovanni Mario Mataloni and as students Leopoldo Metlicovitz and Marcello Dudovich.

Return to Germany
In the first years of the 1900s, after marrying Katharina Plaskuda, a widow, he traveled more and more frequently between Italy and Germany till 1906, when, after winning the competition for the graphical symbol and the poster for the "Esposizione per il Traforo del Sempione", he left Milan for Bonn and Düsseldorf definitively. He settled in Bonn in 1918. The German years saw him engaged mostly as a painter and involved in the decoration of numerous buildings, among them one of the first in constructed reinforced concrete in Renania (1911). He is associated with the Düsseldorf school of painting.

Adolfo Hohenstein died in Bonn 12 April 1928.

Main poster works
 1898 – Corriere della Sera
 1898 – Cintura Calliano contro il mal di mare
 1899 – Onoranze a Volta nel centenario della pila
 1899 – Cesare Urtis & Co. Torino. Forniture electriche
 1900 – Esposizione d'Igiene
 1900 – Monte Carlo. Tir aux pigeons
 1900 – Monaco. Exposition et concours de canots automobiles
 1901 – Bitter Campari
 1905 – Fiammiferi senza fosforo del Dottor Craveri
 1906 – Birra Italia

Main theatre works (Ricordi Archives)

Giacomo Puccini, Le Villi, Milan, Teatro Dal Verme, 31 May 1884
2 original sketches
2 scenario props
Giacomo Puccini, Edgar, Milan, Teatro alla Scala, 21 April 1889
54 original costumes
5 scenario props
Richard Wagner, Mastersingers of Nuremberg, Milan, Teatro alla Scala, 26 December 1889
62 original costumes
4 set props
Alfredo Catalani, Loreley, Torino, Teatro Regio, 16 February 1890
42 original costumes
Alfredo Catalani, La Wally, Milan, Teatro alla Scala, 20 January 1892
4 original sketches
41 original costumes
1 set prop
Alberto Franchetti, Cristoforo Colombo, Milan, Teatro alla Scala, 26 January 1892
90 figurini originali
Niccolò van Westerhout, Cimbelino, Rome, Teatro Argentina, 7 April 1892
37 original costumes
3 set props
Giacomo Puccini, Manon Lescaut, Torino, Teatro Regio, 1893
57 original costumes
4 set props
Giuseppe Verdi, Falstaff, Milan, Teatro alla Scala, 9 February 1893
5 original sketches
41 original costumes
4 set props
13 watercolor designs
Giacomo Puccini, La Bohème, Torino, Teatro Regio, 1 February 1896
3 original sketches
62 original costumes
4 set props
Pietro Mascagni, Iris, Rome, Teatro Costanzi, 22 November 1898
3 original sketches
40 original costumes
9 set props
1 portrait of Mascagni
Giacomo Puccini, Tosca, Rome, Teatro Costanzi, 14 January 1900
3 original sketches
49 original costumes
4 set props
Alberto Franchetti, Germania, Milan, Teatro alla Scala, 1 March 1902
4 original sketches
95 original costumes
7 set props
Franco Alfano, Risurrezione, Torino, Teatro Regio, 1904
2 set props

Exhibitions
 1894 – Esposizioni Riunite, Milan, Biblioteca Nazionale Braidense
 1911 – Katalog der Großen Kunstausstellung Düsseldorf (27 May – 8 October), Düsseldorf, Kunstpalast 
 1912 – Katalog der Frühjahrs-Ausstellung (3 March – 14 April), Düsseldorf, Kunstpalast 
 1916 – Kunstchronik, Neue Folge 26, Munich, Zentralinstitut für Kunstgeschichte
 1917 – Große Berliner Kunstausstellung, Düsseldorf, Kunstpalast (16 June – 30 September): one oil painting, Schwarzwaldküche (Black Forest kitchen)

See also
 Art Nouveau

References

Bibliography
 Dizionario Enciclopedico Bolaffi dei Pittori e degli Incisori Italiani – dall'XI al XX secolo (volume VI). Giulio Bolaffi Editore, Torino, 1974.
 Un secolo di manifesti. Canova-Alberto Maioli Editore, Milano, 1996. .
 Edigeo (a cura di). Enciclopedia dell'arte Zanichelli. Zanichelli, Bologna, 2004. .
 Giorgio Fioravanti. Il dizionario del grafico. Zanichelli, Bologna, 1993.

External links

 2003 Treviso retrospective (in Italian)

1854 births
1928 deaths
Art Nouveau painters
Art Nouveau designers
Art Nouveau illustrators
19th-century German painters
German male painters
20th-century German painters
20th-century German male artists
German poster artists
German illustrators
German designers
Artists from Vienna
Emigrants from the Russian Empire to Germany
19th-century German male artists
Düsseldorf school of painting